Natalia Nemchinova (Ukrainian: Наталія Нємчинова , born 10 June 1975) is a retired tennis player from Ukraine.

Playing for Ukraine at the Fed Cup, Nemchinova has a win–loss record of 0–5.

ITF finals

Singles (1–0)

Doubles (10–5)

References

External links
 
 

Ukrainian female tennis players
1975 births
Living people